Wilkinson is an English surname of Norman origin. It is a variant of Williamson, derived from a variant of William, Wilkin, brought to the Anglo-Scottish border during the Norman conquest. At the time of the British Census of 1881, the relative frequency of the surname Wilkinson was highest in Westmorland (4.3 times the British average), followed by Yorkshire, County Durham, Lincolnshire, Cumberland, Northumberland, Lancashire, Cheshire and Nottinghamshire.  People named Wilkinson include:

A
 A. H. Wilkinson (1875–1954), American politician
 Adrienne Wilkinson, American actress
 Alec Wilkinson (born 1952), American writer
 Alex Wilkinson (born 1984), Australian soccer player
 Alfred Robert Wilkinson VC (1896–1940), British soldier
 Amanda Wilkinson (born 1982), Canadian country singer
 Amandah Wilkinson (born 1987/88), New Zealand-Australian pop musician
 Andrew Wilkinson (disambiguation), several people
 Anne Wilkinson (poet) (1910–1961), Canadian poet and writer

B
Ben Wilkinson (poet) (born 1985), English poet
Ben Wilkinson (born 1987), English footballer
Billy Wilkinson (born 1951), Scottish footballer
Brian Wilkinson (born 1938), Australian swimmer
Bruce Wilkinson, American Christian teacher and writer
Bud Wilkinson (1916–1994), American football player, coach, broadcaster and politician

C
 Carole Wilkinson (born 1950), Australian writer
 Charles Wilkinson (disambiguation), several people
 Chris Wilkinson (disambiguation), several people
 Colm Wilkinson (born 1944), Irish actor
 Crystal Wilkinson, African-American feminist writer

D
 Dan Wilkinson (born 1973), American football player
 David Wilkinson (disambiguation), several people
 Denys Wilkinson (1922–2016), British nuclear physicist
 Dot Wilkinson (born 1921), American softball and bowling player

E
Ed or Edward Wilkinson (disambiguation), several people
Ellen Wilkinson (1891–1947), British Labour Party politician
Endymion Wilkinson (born 1941), British diplomat and historian of China
Ernest L. Wilkinson (1899–1978), American academic administrator, president of Brigham Young University
Ernie Wilkinson (born 1947), English footballer
Eugene P. Wilkinson (1918–2013), United States Navy admiral

F
Frank Wilkinson (1914–2006), American civil liberties activist
Freddy Wilkinson (born 1878), English footballer
Fred Wilkinson (footballer) (born 1889), English footballer
Fred Wilkinson (speedway rider) (1906–1978), British speedway rider

G
 Gary Wilkinson (disambiguation), several people
 Gavin Wilkinson (born 1973), New Zealand soccer player and manager
 Geoffrey Wilkinson (1921–1996), English chemist and Nobel Prize winner
 George Wilkinson (disambiguation), several people
 Gina Wilkinson (1960–2010), Canadian actress, director, and playwright
 Glen Wilkinson (born 1959), Australian professional snooker player
 Grant Wilkinson (born 1974), British criminal

H
 Hannah Wilkinson (born 1992), New Zealand soccer player 
 Herb Wilkinson (born 1923), American basketball player
 Howard Wilkinson (born 1943), English soccer player and manager
 Hubert Wilkinson (1897–1984), English Anglican priest

J
 J. L. Wilkinson (1878–1964), American baseball team owner
 Jack Wilkinson (disambiguation), several people
 Jacob Wilkinson (–1799), English businessman and politician
 James Wilkinson (disambiguation), several people
 Jane Herbert Wilkinson (1798–1880), Texas pioneer
 Jeannette Wilkinson (1841–1886), English suffragist and trade unionist
 Jemima Wilkinson (1752–1819), American charismatic preacher
 Jim Wilkinson (disambiguation), several people
 Jo Wilkinson (disambiguation), several people
 Jane or Joan Wilkinson (died 1556), English silkwoman and Protestant reformer
 Joan Wilkinson (1919–2002), English cricketer
 Joe Wilkinson (disambiguation), several people
 Joseph Wilkinson (disambiguation), several people
 John Wilkinson (disambiguation), several people
 Jonathan Wilkinson (footballer) (1859–1934),  English footballer
 Jonathan Wilkinson (born 1965), Canadian politician 
 Jonny Wilkinson (born 1979), English rugby union player

K
 Kate Wilkinson (1916–1993), American actress
 Kate Wilkinson (politician) (born 1957), New Zealand politician
 Katharine Wilkinson (American writer and climate change activist
 Keith Wilkinson (reporter), British television reporter
 Keith Wilkinson (cricketer) (born 1950), English cricketer
 Kendra Wilkinson (born 1985), American model
 Kevin Wilkinson (1958–1999), English drummer

L
 Laura Starr Ware Wilkinson (1843–1921), American home economist
 Laura Wilkinson (born 1977), American diver
 Leah Wilkinson (born 1986), British field hockey player
 Len Wilkinson (1916–2002), English cricketer
 Lisa Wilkinson (born 1959), Australian television presenter and journalist

M
 Marian Wilkinson (born 1954), Australian journalist and author
 Marianne Wilkinson, Canadian politician
 Mark Wilkinson (disambiguation), several people
 Martha Wilkinson (1941–2014), American literacy campaigner; First Lady of Kentucky (1987–1991)
 Michael Wilkinson (disambiguation), several people
 Monty Wilkinson (footballer) (1908–1979), English footballer
 Monty Wilkinson (lawyer), American lawyer
 Morton S. Wilkinson (1819–1894), American politician

N
 Naomi Wilkinson (born 1974), English TV presenter
 Neil Wilkinson (disambiguation)
 Neville Wilkinson (1869–1940), British Army officer, officer of arms, author and doll-house designer
 Nicholas Browne-Wilkinson (1930–2018), English jurist

O
 Oliver Green-Wilkinson (1913–1970), English Anglican bishop
 Ollie Wilkinson (born 1944), Irish politician

P
 Patrick Wilkinson (scholar) (1907–1985), English classical scholar 
 Patrick Wilkinson (born 1999), American soccer player 
 Paul Wilkinson (political scientist) (1937–2011), British political scientist
 Paul Wilkinson (footballer) (born 1964), English footballer
 Percival Wilkinson (1848–), English rugby union player
 Percival Spearman Wilkinson (1865–1953), British Army general
 Peter Wilkinson (disambiguation), several people
 Philip Wilkinson (disambiguation), several people
 Pinckney Wilkinson (c.1693–1784), British merchant and politician

R
 R. J. Wilkinson (1846–1914), English bookseller and songwriter
 Raven Wilkinson (1935–2018), American ballerina
 Ray Wilkinson (1925–2004), American radio news anchor and reporter
 Rhian Wilkinson (born 1982), Canadian soccer player and coach
 Richard Wilkinson (disambiguation), several people
 Robert Wilkinson (disambiguation), several people
 Roma Wilkinson (born 1918), American songwriter
 Rorden Wilkinson (born 1970), British author and academic
 Rose Wilkinson (1885–1968), Candian politician
 Roy Wilkinson (baseball) (1893–1956), American baseball player
 Roy Wilkinson, British music journalist
 Ruth Wilkinson (1901–1985), New Zealand community leader and local historian

S
 Sarah Scudgell Wilkinson (1779–1831), English writer of children's books
 Scott Wilkinson, known as Yan, member of English alternative rock band Sea Power
 Sharon P. Wilkinson (born 1947), American diplomat
 Shaun Wilkinson (born 1981), English footballer
 Signe Wilkinson (born 1950), American editorial cartoonist
 Simon Wilkinson (composer) (born 1972), British musician and composer
 Simon Wilkinson (transmedia artist), British transmedia artist
 Smith S. Wilkinson (1824–1889), American lawyer and politician
 Spenser Wilkinson (1853–1937), English writer, professor of military history
 Stephen Wilkinson (1919–2021), British choral conductor and composer
 Stephen Wilkinson (born 1978), known as Bibio, English musician and producer
 Steve Wilkinson (disambiguation), several people
 Stuart Wilkinson (cricketer) (born 1942), English cricketer
 Stuart Wilkinson (rugby league) (born 1960), English rugby league football player and coach
 Sue Wilkinson (singer) (1943–2005), British singer and songwriter
 Sue Wilkinson (professor), British feminist academic and advocate for same-sex marriage
 Suzanne Jane Wilkinson, New Zealand engineering academic

T
 Tate Wilkinson (1739–1803), English actor and manager
 Theodore Stark Wilkinson (Louisiana) (1847–1921), American politician
 Theodore Stark Wilkinson (1888–1946), U.S. Navy admiral
 Thomas Wilkinson (disambiguation) or Tom Wilkinson, several people
 Tim Wilkinson (translator) (1947–2020), English translator of Hungarian
 Tim Wilkinson (born 1978), New Zealand golfer
 Toby Wilkinson (born 1969), English Egyptologist
 Tony Wilkinson (1948–2014), British archaeologist and academic
 Tracey Wilkinson, English actress
 Trevor Wilkinson (1923–2008), founder of British sports car manufacturer TVR
 Trevor Wilkinson (squash player) (born 1960), South African squash player
 Tudor Wilkinson (1879–1969), American art collector and dealer

W 
 Wallace Wilkinson (1941–2002), American businessman and politician
 Walter Wilkinson (disambiguation), several people 
 Wilkie Wilkinson (1903–2001), British mechanic, founder member of the British Racing Mechanics Club
 William Wilkinson (disambiguation), several people
 Winston Wilkinson (badminton) (died 2014), Irish badminton player
 Winston Wilkinson (government official) (born 1944), American politician

See also
Wilkinson (disambiguation)
Wilkerson
Wilkins (disambiguation)
Mr. Wilkinson's Widows

References

English-language surnames
Patronymic surnames
Surnames from given names